The Early Years: 1997–2000 is a three-disc set consisting of the first three albums by alternative rock band Switchfoot. This set was released after the band's meteoric rise to mainstream popularity with the double-platinum breakthrough The Beautiful Letdown. The Early Years is seen as an introduction to Switchfoot's earlier material for fans who were introduced to the band with The Beautiful Letdown.

The three discs on this compilation were the original pressings of The Legend of Chin, New Way to Be Human, and Learning to Breathe. The original booklets and artwork are also included in the double jewel case that houses the entire collection.

The Early Years has been certified RIAA Gold, with total sales of over 500,000 copies.

Track listing

The Legend of Chin

New Way to Be Human

Learning to Breathe

References

Switchfoot compilation albums
2004 compilation albums